Evolution's Darling is a science fiction novel by Scott Westerfeld.

Awards
Evolution's Darling was a New York Times Notable Book (2000), and won a Special Citation for the 2000 Philip K. Dick Award.

Reviews

References

2000 American novels
Novels about artists
Novels by Scott Westerfeld
Novels about artificial intelligence